The 2018 Brabantse Pijl was the 58th edition of the Brabantse Pijl cycle race and was held on 11 April 2018. The race started in Leuven and finished in Overijse.

Teams
21 teams participated in the race, including 7 UCI WorldTeams and 14 UCI Professional Continental teams. Each team had a maximum of seven riders:

Result

References

2018
Brabantse Pijl